The Parisian Market (aka Le Marché des parisien or Les Marché des Innocents) is a comic ballet in one act, with libretto and choreography by Marius Petipa and music by Cesare Pugni.

Principal dancers: Mariia Surovshchikova-Petipa (as Lizetta), Marius Petipa (as Simon), and Timofei Stukolkin (as the Marquis Megrèle).

Revivals/Restagings
Restaged by Marius Petipa for the Ballet of the Académie Royale de Musique, (AKA The Paris Opera) under the title Les Marché des Innocents. First presented  on 29 May 1861. For this production Petipa changed the names of the characters Lizetta and Marquis Megrèle to Gloriette and Lindor. Principal Dancers - Mariia Surovshchikova-Petipa (as Gloriette), and Louis Mérante (as Lindor).
Revival by Lev Ivanov for the Imperial Ballet. First presented for the Imperial court at the theatre of Krasnoe Selo, St. Petersburg, on July 6–18, 1892.
Revival by Marius Petipa for the Imperial Ballet. First presented at the Imperial Mariinsky Theatre, St. Peterbsurg, on January 8–20, 1895. Principal Dancers - Maria Anderson (as Lizetta), Sergei Litavkin (as Simon), Enrico Cecchetti (as the Marquis Megrèle)

References

Sources
 Marius Petipa Society: The Parisian Market

Further reading
 Nadine Meisner, 2019: Marius Petipa: The Emperor's Ballet Master. OUP 

Ballets by Marius Petipa
Ballets by Cesare Pugni
1859 ballet premieres
Ballets premiered at the Bolshoi Theatre, Saint Petersburg